Granite Building may refer to:

Granite Building (Denver), a Denver Landmark
Granite Mansion, Newark, Delaware, NRHP-listed
Granite Building (New York City), associated with Alexander S. Wolcott
Granite Building (Rochester, New York), NRHP-listed

Granite Apartments, Anaconda, Montana, NRHP-listed
Granite County Jail, Philipsburg	Montana, NRHP-listed
Granite Hill Farmstead, Danville, Kentucky, NRHP-listed
Granite LDS Ward Chapel-Avard Fairbanks Studio, Sandy, Utah, NRHP-listed
Granite Lumber Company Building, Salt Lake City, Utah, NRHP-listed

Granite Paper Mill, Salt Lake City, Utah, NRHP-listed
Granite Park Chalet, West Glacier, Montana, NRHP-listed
Granite Trust Company, Quincy, Massachusetts, NRHP-listed
Jones Brothers Granite Shed, Barre, Vermont, NRHP-listed
E.L. Smith Roundhouse Granite Shed, Barre, Vermont, NRHP-listed

See also
Granite Store (disambiguation)